Drago Dumbovic (born February 5, 1960) is a Croatian former footballer and a head coach. He is noted for playing indoor soccer and the adoption of the nickname Drago in 1986.

Career 
Dumbovic played in the Yugoslav First League in 1979 with Dinamo Zagreb. Throughout his tenure with Dinamo he played in the 1979–80 UEFA Cup, 1980–81 European Cup Winners' Cup, and the 1982–83 European Cup. In 1983, he played abroad in the Major Indoor Soccer League with Pittsburgh Spirit. After his stint with Pittsburgh he spent time with Wichita Wings, and Minnesota Strikers. In 1985, he signed with league rivals Chicago Sting, where he began using the nickname Drago and shaved his hair. After two seasons in Chicago he played with the Baltimore Blast in 1986.

In 1989, he played in the American Soccer League with Maryland Bays, and with the Washington Diplomats in 1990. In 1990, he played in the National Professional Soccer League with Atlanta Attack, and later with the Detroit Rockers. During his time in Detroit he assisted in securing the NPSL Championship in the 1991–92 season. In 1991, he played in Canada with Windsor Wheels in the National Soccer League. After three seasons with the Rockers he played in Continental Indoor Soccer League with Detroit Neon, and a season with Pittsburgh Stingers and Sacramento Knights.

In 1998, he returned to his former team the Detroit Rockers.

Managerial career  
Dumbovic began coaching in the National Professional Soccer League with the Detroit Rockers in the 1998-1999 season as an interim assistant coach for Bryan Finnerty. The following season he was given head coach responsibilities. In 2003, he was appointed the head coach for  Saginaw Valley State University's women's soccer team. In 2014, he was named the director for Cleveland United's girl soccer program.

Honors 
Detroit Rockers
 NPSL Championship (1): 1991–92

References 

1960 births
Living people
Footballers from Zagreb
Association footballers not categorized by position
Yugoslav footballers
Croatian footballers
Croatian expatriate football managers
GNK Dinamo Zagreb players
Pittsburgh Spirit players
Wichita Wings (MISL) players
Minnesota Strikers (MISL) players
Chicago Sting (MISL) players
Baltimore Blast (1980–1992) players
Maryland Bays players
Atlanta Attack players
Washington Diplomats (1988–1990) players
Detroit Rockers players
Detroit Neon players
Pittsburgh Stingers players
Sacramento Knights (CISL) players
Yugoslav First League players
Major Indoor Soccer League (1978–1992) players
American Soccer League (1988–89) players
National Professional Soccer League (1984–2001) players
Canadian National Soccer League players
Continental Indoor Soccer League players
Yugoslav expatriate footballers
Croatian expatriate footballers
Yugoslav expatriate sportspeople in Canada
Yugoslav expatriate sportspeople in the United States
Croatian expatriate sportspeople in the United States
Expatriate soccer players in Canada
Expatriate soccer players in the United States